A shaman is a practitioner of shamanism, a religious practice that involves interacting with a spirit world through altered states of consciousness, such as trance.

Shaman or Shamans may also refer to:

Places
 Mount Shaman, Transbaikalia, Russia
 Shaman Rock, Transbaikalia, Russia
 Shaman-Gora archaeological site, Russia
 Shaman, Iran, a village in Semnan Province, Iran

Arts, entertainment, and media

Gaming
 Shaman (accessory), an accessory sourcebook for the role-playing game Advanced Dungeons & Dragons, 2nd Edition
 Shaman (character class), a character class in role-playing games
 Shaman (Dungeons & Dragons), a character class in the role-playing game Dungeons & Dragons

Literature
 Shaman (comics), a Marvel Comics character
 Shaman (novel), a 2013 novel by Kim Stanley Robinson

Music
 Shaman (album), a 2002 album by musician Carlos Santana
 Shaman (band), a Brazilian power metal band, briefly spelled as Shaaman
 Shaman (singer), an alias of Yaroslav Dronov, a Russian singer
 Shamans (album), a 2002 album by musician Aziza Mustafa Zadeh
 Korpiklaani, a Finnish folk metal band formerly known as Shaman
 The Shamen, a British dance band
 "Shaman", a song by the 3rd and the Mortal from the album Tears Laid in Earth

Other uses
 Aerodyne Shaman, a series of French single-place paragliders
 Avtoros Shaman, an 8x8 all-terrain vehicle with inverted wheels